This is an index of Microsoft Windows games.

This list has been split into multiple pages.  Please use the Table of Contents to browse it.

 

Windows